Tim Huth is a German sprint canoer who competed in the mid-2000s. He won a bronze medal in the K-2 1000 m event at the 2003 ICF Canoe Sprint World Championships in Gainesville.

References

German male canoeists
Living people
Year of birth missing (living people)
ICF Canoe Sprint World Championships medalists in kayak